Gabriel Obadin Aikhena (born 9 May 1986 in Iseyin, Nigeria) is a Singaporean-Nigerian footballer, who currently plays for Nay Pyi Taw F.C.

Honours
Balestier Khalsa
 League Cup: 2013

References

External links 

1986 births
Living people
Singaporean footballers
Nigerian footballers
Expatriate footballers in Benin
AS Dragons FC de l'Ouémé players
Association football defenders
Nigerian expatriate sportspeople in Benin
Gombak United FC players
Nigerian expatriate footballers
Singaporean expatriate footballers
Singaporean people of Nigerian descent
Young Lions FC players
Balestier Khalsa FC players
Singapore Premier League players
Union Bank F.C. players